James Yeats may refer to:

James Yeats (American football) player for 1960 Houston Oilers season
James Yeats, character in British Intelligence (film)

See also
James Yates (disambiguation)